The Racing Rules of Sailing (often abbreviated to RRS)  govern the conduct of yacht racing, windsurfing, kitesurfing, model boat racing, dinghy racing and virtually any other form of racing around a course with more than one vessel while powered by the wind. A new revision is published every four years (after the Olympic Games) by World Sailing, the sport's world governing body.  Full information on the rules can be viewed at World Sailing.

Contents of the Rules 

Racing Rules of Sailing were most dramatically simplified in 1997 since the 1940s. The new document contains four main rules [Part 2, Section A]:

 Boats on a port tack shall keep clear of boats on starboard tack (Rule 10).
 When boats are on the same tack and overlapped, the boat to windward (the boat closest to the wind) shall keep clear of a leeward boat (Rule 11).
 When boats are on the same tack and not overlapped, the boat that is astern shall keep clear of the boat ahead. (Rule 12).
 When a boat is tacking (changing tack) it shall keep clear of boats that are not tacking (Rule 13).

Four rules about general limitations: [Part 2, Section B]

 Even if you have right-of-way, it is your duty to avoid a collision, once it becomes apparent that the other boat is not keeping clear (Rule 14).
 If you acquire right of way, you must initially give the other boat room to keep clear, unless you get right of way because of the other boat's actions. (Rule 15)
 A boat that changes course, even if it has the right-of-way, shall do so in a manner that gives the burdened boat a chance to "keep clear" (Rule 16).
 If you catch up with another boat and you want to pass it to leeward, you may not sail above your proper course i.e. you shall not luff higher than you would have done if that boat wasn't there (Rule 17)

Three rules about marks and obstructions [Part 2, Section C]
plus some other rules about starting errors, taking penalties, moving astern, when you are capsized or anchored or run aground, and interfering with another boat.

In total there are 91 rules but (since the major simplification in 1997) only 15 rules govern what boats do when they meet on the water (part 2 rules). It is not necessary to know all of the rules to successfully compete in a dinghy race, but a knowledge of the basics is recommended.

Sailboat racing is a self-regulated sport.  As stated by the Racing Rules of Sailing, "Competitors in the sport of sailing are governed by a body of rules that they are expected to follow and enforce. A fundamental principle of sportsmanship is that when competitors break a rule they will promptly take a penalty, which may be to retire.".

Depending on the nature of the infraction, the penalty may be either: (1) performing a turn consisting of one tack and one gybe or (2) performing two turns consisting of two tacks and two gybes (except for windsurfing).

For most rules infractions, a competitor may be absolved from disqualification from the race by taking such a penalty. However, if the infraction caused injury or serious damage, or produced a significant advantage in the race or series, the penalty shall be to retire. If a competitor fails to take penalty turn(s) they may be disqualified after a hearing by the Protest Committee. The aforementioned principles do not apply to match racing (like the America's Cup) where on-the-water umpires impose penalties immediately after an infraction occurs.

Race signals 

Sail races are governed with flags and sound signals to indicate flag changes. The flags used are taken from the International maritime signal flag set. During a race and for any signal concerning the race, these flags are defined in the Racing Rules of Sailing but the signal can be modified by the Sailing Instructions.

The raising (hoisting) or removing of a visual signal is accompanied by the emission of a sound signal to draw attention to the new signal. The type of the sound signal (one short sound,  two short sounds, one long sound, etc.) is described by the rule according to the type of signal.
The usual meanings of these flags are as follows:

Postponement signal 

The Answering Pennant (AP) with or without a numerical pennant is used to indicate a postponed race.
A numerical pennant below the AP denotes the time, in hours, of the race postponement.

Preparatory signal 

These signal flags are used before a race start and most commonly as part of a start sequence/procedure.

Start signal 
These signal flags are used in the pre-start procedure.  Class flags can be numeral pennants 1 , 2 , and 3   however they can be substituted to avoid confusion with the postponement signals relating to a particular class.

Recall signal

Course change signal

Abandonment signal

Other signals

See also

 Dinghy racing
 International Regulations for Preventing Collisions at Sea

Notes

External links
 World Sailing - A Short History
 Racing Rules of Sailing
 Interactive & multilingual sailboat racing rules game 
 RacingRulesOfSailing.org - The Unofficial Source for the Racing Rules of Sailing

Sailing rules and handicapping
Sailing manoeuvres
Signal flags